The Wakolo myzomela (Myzomela wakoloensis) is a species of bird in the family Meliphagidae. It is endemic to Indonesia, where it occurs in the Moluccan Islands of Buru and Seram. Its natural habitats are subtropical or tropical moist lowland forests, subtropical or tropical mangrove forests, and subtropical or tropical moist montane forests.

References

Wakolo myzomela
Birds of Buru
Birds of Seram
Wakolo myzomela
Taxonomy articles created by Polbot